Mariya Valeryevna Baklakova (born 14 March 1997) is a Russian swimmer. She competed in the 4 × 200 metre freestyle relay event at the 2012 Summer Olympics.

References

The Sports Profile

1997 births
Living people
Russian female swimmers
Russian female freestyle swimmers
Olympic swimmers of Russia
Swimmers at the 2012 Summer Olympics
Universiade medalists in swimming
Universiade gold medalists for Russia
Universiade silver medalists for Russia
Universiade bronze medalists for Russia
Medalists at the 2017 Summer Universiade
Medalists at the 2019 Summer Universiade
People from Chaykovsky, Perm Krai
Sportspeople from Perm Krai
20th-century Russian women
21st-century Russian women